El-Amrah is a site about  south of Badari, Upper Egypt.

Archaeological discoveries in 1901 at El-Amrah, were the basis of what is now known as the Amratian culture, a Naqada I culture of predynastic Upper Egypt, that lasted from 4400 BC to  3500 BC.

References

Neolithic cultures of Africa
Predynastic Egypt
4th millennium BC in Egypt
1901 archaeological discoveries
Amratian culture